Padethayaza (–1754), also spelt Padesarājā, was a minister who served the last three monarchs at the Nyaungyan court, and was a prominent writer and poet. He is known for composing pyo, lyrical poems based on the Jataka tales. While he wrote traditional works pertaining to Buddhism, he was also known for expanding his repertoire, drawing from Hindu tales, apocryphal birth stories of the Buddha (Paññāsa Jātaka), current events such as the arrival of Thai envoys to the Burmese court, and village life for peasants (in the form of folk songs). After the demise of the Nyaungyan court in 1754, Padethayaza was captured and taken to Pegu (Bago).

List of works 

 Manikhet Pyo (မဏိခက်ပျို့)

References 

1683 births
1754 deaths
Burmese writers
First Toungoo Empire
Burmese dramatists and playwrights
Burmese male poets
18th-century Burmese poets
18th-century dramatists and playwrights
18th-century male writers